Podunajské Biskupice (1927–1944 Biskupice pri Dunaji, before 1927 Biskupice) is a borough of Bratislava. It is the largest borough in the terms of area in Bratislava.

History
The first written account of Podunajské Biskupice dates to the 13th century, it's church is mentioned in 1221. 

Biskupice were part of the property of the Estergom archbishopric. Based on this name, some authors infer the existence of an Avar bishopric in the area of today's Biskupice, as there was a different word for archbishopric and bishopric in Latin and in old Hungarian. The territory of the Christian Avar bishopric and includes the area from Lake Nezider to the vicinity of Biskupice and the river Ráb.

On April 21, 1704, was a battle between the Hungarian rebels (Kuruc) and Danes (Battle of Biskupice). It became an official part of Bratislava on 1 January 1972.

Historical landmarks 
The Romans also allegedly lived in Podunajské Biskupice, a Roman militia of Emperor Alexander Sever from 230 and a Latin inscription on a rock, which originally stood near the parish church with the stamp of the Roman camp, were found here. Through the Danube, Biskupice led the so-called amber road that led from Rome to the Baltic coast.

In Podunajské Biskupice there is the Roman Catholic Church of St. Nicholas from 1221. In the town, there is also the manor of Juraj Albert from the 18th century and the plague column of the Virgin Mary and the Holy Trinity from 1730.

There is a monastery of the Sisters of Mercy of the Holy Cross. In the monastery church of St. Crosses are kept relics bl. Zdenka Schelingová, who was buried in the local cemetery until 2003.

Lieskovec Manor or Lieskovec Summer Castle is located in Bratislava in the Podunajské Biskupice district in the Lieskovec district. The mansion was built by Cardinal Jozef Batthyányi between 1779 and 1783. It originally stood in the middle of the archbishop's garden. The decoration of the mansion is destroyed, it is used as a warehouse.

The Trade Museum in Bratislava is located in the premises of a country manor surrounded by a park. The museum was established in 1983.

Church of Saint Nicholas 
The Church of St. Nicholas is a Roman Catholic parish church located in Bratislava in the Podunajské Biskupice district on Vetvárská Street in the parish of Bratislava - Podunajské Biskupice. It is a 3-nave Romanesque-Gothic church from the middle of the 13th century, with a polygonal sanctuary and one tower on the west side. Since it has been rebuilt more than once since its inception, it bears the hallmarks of various styles - Gothic, Romanesque, Baroque, and Classicist.

Inclusion into Bratislava 
In 1944, the village of Komárov was added to the Podunajské Biskupice.[5] On January 1, 1972, the Podunajské Biskupice became part of Bratislava.

See also
 Kopáčsky ostrov

References

External links
Official website 
About history of Podunajské Biskupice 

Boroughs of Bratislava
Villages in Slovakia merged with towns